Mount Dundas is a mountain located in the West Coast region of Tasmania, Australia. The mountain is situated at the north west edge of the West Coast Range.

As colourful a history as that of Mount Lyell, Mount Dundas has had a range of mines and railways such as the North East Dundas Tramway within its vicinity.

The name is also incorporated into the name of the major newspaper of the west coast, the Zeehan and Dundas Herald.

The main copper and gold ore bearing deposits in the West Coast Range are known as occurring in the 'Mount Read Volcanics' relating to the complex geology of the area, and also silver at Mount Dundas.

See also

 List of highest mountains of Tasmania
West Coast Tasmania Mines
Emu Bay Railway
Railways on the West Coast of Tasmania

References

Further reading
 
 
2003 edition – Queenstown: Municipality of Queenstown. 
1949 edition – Hobart: Davies Brothers. ; ASIN B000FMPZ80
1924 edition – Queenstown: Mount Lyell Tourist Association. ; ASIN B0008BM4XC

Dundas, Mount
Dundas, Mount
Dundas, Mount
Dundas, Mount